MEWS College of Management & IT (abbreviated MEWS or MEWS College) established in Bhuj-Kutch of Gujarat (India) in 2012. It runs Bachelor of Business Administration (BBA) and Bachelor of Computer Application (BCA) courses. The college is managed by the Muslim Education & Welfare Society, which was established in 1964 and is the biggest Muslim educational organization in Kutch district. MEWS also runs a government recognized KG Section to High School (Gujarati & English Medium), Higher Secondary School (Gujarati Medium), MEWS Study Center and Hostel.

Campus
MEWS College campus is located at Bhuj, near Airport Road called "MEWS Educational Complex". The campus is on 16 acres of land which has cricket, football ground, and volleyball court. The campus also includes KG to High School Sections and Higher Secondary School.

References

Universities and colleges in Gujarat
Education in Kutch district
Bhuj